LC3 or LC-3 may refer to:

 LC3 (classification), a para-cycling classification
 Little Computer 3, a type of computer educational programming language
 Limestone Calcined Clay Cement, a low-carbon cement
 Fauteuil Grand Confort, a club chair designed by Le Corbusier and Charlotte Perriand
 MAP1LC3B, a protein involved in autophagy
 MAP1LC3A, a protein
 LC3 (codec), a Bluetooth audio codec
 Rocket launch sites : 
 Cape Canaveral Air Force Station Launch Complex 3, a deactivated US Air Force launch site
 Vandenberg AFB Space Launch Complex 3, a NASA launch site that has been used by a variety of rocket systems
 Xichang Launch Complex 3, an active rocket launch site in the People's Republic of China

See also

 Launch Complex 3 (disambiguation)
 LCIII (disambiguation)
 LCCC (disambiguation)
 L3C (disambiguation)
 IC3 (disambiguation)

 LC (disambiguation)
 
 

Technology and engineering disambiguation pages